Dougan is the surname of the following people:
Ángel Serafín Seriche Dougan (born 1946), Prime Minister of Equatorial Guinea 
B. H. Dougan (1867–1940), Canadian physician and politician 
Bobby Dougan (1926–2010), Scottish football player
Brady Dougan (born 1959), American banker
Brandon Dougan (born 1995), Irish and Vietnamese Healthcare Professional
Derek Dougan (1938–2007), Northern Ireland football player and manager 
George Dougan (1891–1955), Northern Ireland doctor
Geraldine Dougan, Northern Ireland politician
Gordon Dougan, British microbiologist
Jackie Dougan (1930–1973), British jazz drummer
John Dougan (1946–2006), New Zealand rugby union player
Lucy Dougan, (1966–), Australian poet
Luther Lee Dougan (1883–1983), American architect who founded the Houghtaling & Dougan firm
Martin Dougan (born 1988), Scottish television presenter 
Max Dougan, Scottish football player
Michael Dougan, British law professor 
Patrick Dougan (1889–?), Scottish football winger
R. G. Dougan, American football coach 
Rob Dougan (born 1969), Australian composer 
Sue Dougan (born 1974), Northern Irish radio presenter 
Tommy Dougan (1915–1980), Scottish football forward
Vikki Dougan (born 1929), American model and actress

See also